Henry Ibbetson  may refer to:

Henry Selwin-Ibbetson, British Conservative politician
Henry Ibbotson, English botanist